Mali competed at the 1972 Summer Olympics in Munich, West Germany.

References
Official Olympic Reports

Nations at the 1972 Summer Olympics
1972
1972 in Mali